Margaret Anne Marshall OBE (born 4 January 1949) is a Scottish soprano.

Marshall was born in Stirling. Her career started in the 1970s and she has sung a wide range of classical and operatic roles up to her retirement in 2004. She received the James Gulliver Award for Performing Arts in Scotland in 1991, in 1999 she was appointed Officer of the Order of the British Empire in the New Year Honours, and on 23 June 2009 she was awarded an honorary degree of Doctor of Music from the University of St Andrews.

Biography

Margaret Marshall studied singing at the Royal Scottish Academy of Music and Drama in Glasgow with Ena Mitchell, with whom she continued to study after graduating. Awarded a Caird Travelling Acholarship, Marshall travelled to Munich to study with German bass-baritone Hans Hotter, who suggested she enter the ARD International Music Competition in Munich.

Winning first prize in the 1974 ARD Competition, singing Purcell and Bach in the final, launched Marshall's international career that initially focussed on the concert platform. In 1975 she made her recital debut at the Wigmore Hall in London and her Royal Festival Hall debut, in J. S. Bach's St Matthew Passion. She also made her first recording with Rudolf Ewerhardt singing J. C. Bach's Salve Regina and Galuppi's Rapida Cerva. She then participated in the series of recordings of Vivaldi's complete sacred vocal music with the English Chamber Orchestra conducted by Vittorio Negri. She then also recorded Bach's Mass in B minor with Sir Neville Marriner and the Academy of St Martin in the Fields.

Her first operatic role was Euridice in Gluck's Orfeo which she first sang on the concert platform in the Queen Elizabeth Hall with Sir John Eliot Gardiner before making her stage debut in Florence with Riccardo Muti in 1977, a role she subsequently recorded with Muti and the Philharmonia Orchestra. The Italian conductor invited her back to Florence for his first production Le Nozze di Figaro in 1979, in which she sang the role of the Countess.

On the opera platform, Marshall was best known for her interpretation of Mozartian roles. She sang the Countess in Figaro in many of the world's leading opera houses including the Royal Opera House London, La Scala Milan, Wiener Staatsoper and Deutsche Oper Berlin as well as with Scottish Opera. She made her Salzburg Festival debut in 1982 singing Fiordiligi in Così fan tutte with Riccardo Muti and the Vienna Philharmoniker in Michael Hampe's production that remained in the Festival's repertoire until 1991. She also recorded Fiordiligi with Muti and the Vienna Philharmonic. Other opera houses in which she sang Fiordiligi include the Royal Opera House, Frankfurt Opera, Zurich Opera and Scottish Opera.

Other Mozart roles included Pamina (Die Zauberflöte), Vitellia (La clemenza di Tito), Ilia (Idomeneo), Arminda (La finta giardiniera); Donna Elvira and Donna Anna (Don Giovanni). Other roles include Violetta (La traviata), the Marschallin (Der Rosenkavalier), the Countess (Capriccio), Lucio (Tito Manlio), and Hypernmestre (Salieri's Les Danaïdes).

Marshall's concert career, in parallel with her stage performances, included singing with The Berlin Philharmonic Orchestra, Vienna Philharmonic, Vienna Symphony Orchestra, Bayerische Rundfunk Orchester, London Philharmonic, London Symphony Orchestra, Philharmonia Orchestra, the Academy of St Martin in the Fields, Royal Scottish National Orchestra, Scottish Chamber Orchestra, the Orchestre de Paris, New York Philharmonic Orchestra, Boston Symphony Orchestra, Philadelphia Orchestra, Chicago Symphony Orchestra and the Dallas Symphony Orchestra. Conductors she regularly performed with included Claudio Abbado, Riccardo Muti, Sir Neville Marriner, Carlo Maria Giulini, Sir John Elliot Gardiner, Bernard Haitink, Daniel Barenboim, Zubin Mehta, Christian Thielemann, Sir Alexander Gibson, Sir Charles Groves, Sir Adrian Boult, Jeffrey Tate, Michael Gielen, Gary Bertini, Vittorio Negri, and Georg Fischer

Marshall excelled in Baroque music, where her repertoire included Bach's Mass in B minor, St Matthew Passion, St John Passion, Jauchzet Gott and many other cantatas; Handel's Messiah, Jeptha and Dixit Dominus. She recorded the St Matthew Passion with Michael Corboz and the Lausanne Chamber Orchestra, Jeptha with Sir Neville Marriner and the Academy of St Martin in the Fields, Handel's Messiah and Dixit Dominus with Sir John Elliot Gardiner and the English Baroque Soloists, Bach Mass in B minor with Sir Neville Marriner and Pergolesi Stabat Mater with Claudio Abbado. Her discography also includes recordings of Mozart's C Minor Mass, Haydn's The Creation, Mahler's Symphonies 4 and 8, Elgar's The Kingdom and Vaughan Williams' Sea Symphony.

References

External links

Short biography, bach-cantatas.com
Short biography, Gazetteer for Scotland

1949 births
Living people
People from Stirling
Officers of the Order of the British Empire
Alumni of the Royal Conservatoire of Scotland
Scottish operatic sopranos
21st-century Scottish women opera singers
20th-century Scottish women opera singers
Prize-winners of the ARD International Music Competition